Ben Allal may refer to:

 Nordine Ben Allal, a Belgian criminal of Moroccan origin
 Ben Allal, Aïn Defla, a town in northern Algeria.